Glenwood Caverns Adventure Park is an adventure park located above Glenwood Springs, Colorado, about  west of Denver. Prior to 2003, only cave tours were available until a major expansion took place. Today, the park features numerous attractions in addition to the cave tours.

History

Discovery

In the late 1800s, Charles W. Darrow discovered a cave system on Iron Mountain after hearing the mountain "whistle". The source was the cave mouth, and in 1895 Darrow opened the caves to the public. Methods of getting to the caves included horseback and walking. In 1897, Darrow was able to bring electric lights to the cave with the help of the city's hydro-electric plant, becoming one of the first caves to do so. In the same year, a tunnel was blasted out to Glenwood Canyon with an observation deck named Exclamation Point. With the onset of World War I, the caves were closed to the public in 1917.

New ownership

In 1999, Steve and Jeanne Beckley, who own the land the cave is on, reopened the cave to the public after restoration work. The caverns were accessed by bus, using a small building next to the Hotel Colorado as a base. In 2002, the Beckleys gained approval to build a massive expansion. The centerpiece would be a pulse gondola built by Poma and a visitor center at the top of the mountain that included a restaurant. The tramway would allow year-round access to the caverns. A large sluice box and gift shop were also available to the public. The expansion proved to be a massive success, attracting 150,000 people before the one-year anniversary.

Development into adventure park

Because the tramway increased uphill capacity, lines for the cave tours grew. To provide patrons with something to do while waiting for the cave tours, the park added attractions. Major additions included North America's first alpine coaster, a zip ride, a swing style attraction, and a climbing wall. All attractions opened for the summer season in May 2005. Many of the attractions were named by locals. In order to satisfy the increased demand, each pulse on the gondola received another cabin as well. From 2005 to 2010, various attractions were added, such as a 4-D theater, the first in Colorado, and other temporary features. The next major attraction came in 2010 in the form the Giant Canyon Swing, an S&S Power Screamin' Swing. The swing has since attracted notability throughout the theme park world and has been featured on numerous television shows. About this time, the zip ride moved, sharing a joint tower structure with a bungee jump.

Further expansions

2012 saw the biggest expansion since 2005, when three new rides were brought to the park. These included a Zierer kiddie coaster and an SBF/Visa Ferris wheel, both relocated from a park in Canada. The major addition was the Cliffhanger roller coaster, relocated from the closed Celebration City in Branson, Missouri. The coaster saw a grand opening in June of that year. In 2013, it was revealed that the park was working on an expansion of the upper part of the cave system. With this expansion, the single cave tour was split into two smaller 40-minute tours, allowing increased capacity. The tramway undertook its own expansion, adding two more pulses; this brought the total to six, with eighteen cabins in all, the maximum efficiency of the tramway. The next ride came in 2014, an SBF/Visa custom swing named Glenwood Canyon Flyer, installed as a milder alternative to the Giant Canyon Swing. It made an appearance on the show Thrill Factor in 2015 in "Kari Has No Sense". Early 2017 brought an official announcement of the next new ride, the Haunted Mine Drop, which opened in the summer of that year. The drop tower is the first in the world to drop underground and the first to start at the top instead of at the bottom and features prominent themes in addition to the  drop. The park is also expected to receive two new "adventure vehicles" that will join the one the park received in 2016. The purpose of the vehicles is to provide alternate transportation up the mountain, replacing the buses that the park uses for inclement weather. These vehicles will also be used to relieve congestion of the tramway, as it has reached maximum capacity.

For 2019, the Iron Mountain Tramway was placed by the Glenwood Gondola, with 44 detachable cabins and capacity to transport 1,000 people per hour up and down the mountain. The original towers were reused, with Leitner-Poma supplying new detachable terminals and new cabins.

Rides and attractions

Caverns
When the cave was first opened to visitors in 1895, only a small portion was accessible. Essentially abandoned in 1917, the cave was left ungated. During this time, more rooms were discovered; however, this expansion came at a price, as vandals often took advantage of the cave. In the 1960s, Pete Prebble bought the cave from the Darrow family and sealed the cave, with the hopes of making a commercial venture of it in the future. While he never achieved this, he did explore more of the cave system, finding it to be much bigger than expected. He eventually found what became known as The Barn by squeezing through what is known as Jam Crack. The cave is now separated into three sections, upper, middle, and lower parts. Even at three miles, the Fairy Cave (the official title of the system) is one of the largest systems in the state and a rarity among caves, as it was formed by hot springs. The cave is still being actively explored by a few cavers.

Historic Fairy Caves Tour

The Fairy Cave Tour, a quarter-mile long, takes place in the upper section of the cave. The first half of the tour re-traces the steps of the original explorers, before going through the Darrow tunnel. This leads to Exclamation Point, looking  into Glenwood Canyon. The second half of the tour, opened in 2013, explores places once only accessible by the Wild Tour. Focusing on the history of the cave, including how it was named, the tour lasts 40 minutes and, because the cave is relatively small, accommodates only 20 guests per tour.

Kings Row Tour

Formally the second half of the original cave tour prior to 2013, this tour predominantly features two rooms, The Barn and Kings Row, which are in the middle section of the cave. Guests enter through the bore before entering the top of The Barn. This tour focuses more on formations and cave geology, as guests descend 127 stairs to the bottom of The Barn, at the entrance to Kings Row. Here guides will point out the many features of what is the most decorated cave room in the state. The tour features a light show, part of which highlights the cave's bio-luminescence. Guests then return slowly to the start of the tour. The tour last 40 minutes and accommodates 25 people.

Wild Cave Tours

Wild Cave Tours are by reservation only at specific times during peak hours and by appointment only during off-peak, depending on guide availability. These are not walking tours; guests participate in an actual caving experience that requires strenuous activity, including climbing and crawling, sometimes for extended periods. However, participants are rewarded with a more pristine cave, less-visited rooms and smaller groups. The experience last three hours and accommodates groups of eight or fewer.

Incidents

On the evening of September 5, 2021, 6-year-old Wongel Estifanos died on the Haunted Mine Drop ride after being separated from her seat and falling  to her death. It has been determined that the girl was actually sitting on top of her seatbelt rather than the seatbelt being tight on her lap. A forensic pathologist identified the cause of death as blunt-force trauma. The official report by the Colorado Division of Oil and Public Safety blamed a lack of procedures and inadequate training of two ride operators to ensure that Estifanos was properly buckled in. Before the accident, the ride had had four annual safety inspections per Colorado Amusement Rides and Devices Regulations (7 CCR 1101-12) and was certified to have corrected any issues. Following the incident the park temporarily closed. Colorado Senate Bill 03-253 allows parents to release their minor’s rights to sue for negligence.

The Alpine Coaster ride has caused several injuries to riders. In 2007, a parent and daughter were hospitalized after being thrown from the ride into a fence. In 2010, a 10-year old was thrown from the ride and landed in rocks, resulting in a bloody face. In 2011, a woman broke her back after failing to brake for nine stalled carts on the track. The woman filed a lawsuit, but it was dismissed.

References

External links
Glenwood Caverns website

 
Caves of Colorado
Glenwood Springs, Colorado
Landforms of Garfield County, Colorado
Tourist attractions in Garfield County, Colorado
Show caves in the United States
Adventure parks
Amusement parks in Colorado